Local Route 78 Gimpo–Pocheon Line is a local route of South Korea that connecting Wolgot-myeon, Gimpo to Pocheon, Gyeonggi Province.

History
This route was established on 25 August 2001.

Stopovers
 Gyeonggi Province
 Gimpo 
 Seoul
 Gangseo District
 Gyeonggi Province
 Goyang - Paju - Yeoncheon County - Pocheon

Major intersections 

 (■): Motorway
IS: Intersection, IC: Interchange

Gimpo · Seoul

Gyeonggi Province (North of Seoul)

See also 
 Roads and expressways in South Korea
 Transportation in South Korea

References

External links 
 MOLIT South Korean Government Transport Department

78
Roads in Gyeonggi
Roads in Seoul